Weary River is a 1929 American romantic drama film directed by Frank Lloyd and starring Richard Barthelmess, Betty Compson, and William Holden (no relation to William Holden, star of such films as Sunset Boulevard). Produced and distributed by First National Pictures, the film, like many made during the changeover from silent to sound movies, is mostly silent with a few sequences featuring synchronized dialogue and singing. Based on a story by Courtney Riley Cooper, the film is about a gangster who goes to prison and finds salvation through music while serving his time. After he is released and falls back into a life of temptation, he is saved by the love of a woman and the warden who befriended him. The film received a nomination for an Academy Award for Best Director in 1930.

Weary River was preserved at the Library of Congress and restored by the LoC, UCLA Film and Television Archive, and Warner Bros. It is available on DVD directly from the Warner Archive Collection.

While Barthelmess's character sings and plays the piano throughout the film, Barthelmess did not sing or play the piano. Frank Churchill played the piano, and Johnny Murray sang into a microphone far away from Barthelmess while he lip-synced and played a piano that had strings deadened with felt.

Plot
Jerry Larrabee is framed by rival gangster Spadoni and sent to prison, where he is befriended by a kind and understanding warden. Through the warden's patient influence, Jerry becomes interested in music and forms a prison band, broadcasting over the radio. Jerry's singing deeply moves his radio listeners, and soon Jerry is given a pardon by the governor.

Jerry pursues a singing career in vaudeville, billing himself as the Master of Melody, but constant whispers of "Convict!" from the audience disturb his concentration. Moving from job to job, Jerry is haunted by his past. With no hope of succeeding in music, Jerry returns to his old gang and takes up with his former sweetheart Alice Gray. As he prepares for a final confrontation with Spadoni, Alice gets in touch with the warden, who arrives on the scene in time to keep Jerry on the straight and narrow path. Jerry eventually becomes a radio star and marries Alice.

Cast
 Richard Barthelmess as Jerry Larrabee
 Betty Compson as Alice Gray
 William Holden as Warden
 Louis Natheaux as Spadoni
 George Stone as Blackie
 Raymond Turner as Elevator Boy
 Gladden James as Manager
 Robert Emmett O'Connor as Police Sergeant (uncredited)
 Johnny Murray as Jerry Larrabee's singing voice (uncredited)

References

External links
 
 
 
 
 Weary River at Virtual History

1929 films
Films directed by Frank Lloyd
Films based on short fiction
American gangster films
First National Pictures films
Transitional sound films
American black-and-white films
American romantic drama films
1929 romantic drama films
1920s American films